The Constitutional era of the Ottoman Empire may refer to:

 First Constitutional Era (Ottoman Empire) (1876-1878)
 Second Constitutional Era (Ottoman Empire) (1908-1920)